The Suamico class were a class of 25 United States Navy oilers during World War II. Built to the Maritime Commission T2-SE-A1 (Suamico class), -A2 (Escambia class) and -A3 (Cohocton) designs, they used turbo-electric transmission, obviating the need for reduction gearing which was a major issue in US mass-production shipbuilding.

Construction

The Suamicos
Just before the war the United States Maritime Commission had developed a standardized tanker design, the T2, which could be mass-produced in time of war, and militarized as needed for naval auxiliaries. The T2 was given sufficient engine power to attain , which the Navy considered the minimum required for a fleet oiler.

The T2 and its variants (see ) however used conventional geared steam turbine propulsion, and with the massive expansion of US shipbuilding, a production bottleneck developed: the limited availability of the precision machinery needed to manufacture reduction gearing. The Sun Shipbuilding and Drydock Company of Chester, Pennsylvania worked around this problem by designing a T2 variant which used turbo-electric propulsion; that is, the steam turbine ran a generator, which in turn powered electric drive motors without the need for gearing. Compared to conventional geared turbines turbo-electric systems produced less power for the same size and weight, so Sun's T2-SE (steam-electric)-A1 design could only develop 6,000 shaft horsepower for 14 knots, but since commercial tankers typically only did 12–13 knots this was acceptable. Acknowledging the practicality of the design for merchant service, the Maritime Commission ordered 72 T2-SE-A1s from four shipyards in May 1941. Ultimately 536 T2-SEs would be built, the most-produced tanker design in history.

On 9 June 1942, Admiral Nimitz indicated an immediate need for four more fleet oilers. The War Shipping Board requisitioned the last remaining T2 and T2-A tankers still in commercial service, Catawba and Aekay, and, with reservations given their limited speed, two nearly-complete Sun T2-SE-A1s, Harlem Heights and Valley Forge. These were commissioned as USS Suamico (AO-49) and Tallulah (AO-50). In August, with the fourteen repeats of the big   still a year from completion, the Navy took over the next two T2-SEs off Sun's ways, Oriskany and Stillwater, renamed Pecos (AO-65) and Cache (AO-67). On 7 August the Auxiliary Vessels Board recommended that the Navy add two oilers per month for a period of six months. While fifteen of the 15.3-knot T3-S-A1 type had been ordered by the Maritime Commission, only five (the ) would be completed in time, and so the Navy filled out the requirement with another seven T2-SE-A1s, AO-73 through 79, the first of which were acquired on the last day of 1942.

The Escambias

During the spring and summer of 1942, a period German U-boat captains called "the happy time," tankers were being sunk in the Atlantic faster than they could be built. In response, on 27 July the Maritime Commission decided that the new Marinship yard at Sausalito, California, created to produce Liberty ships, would construct T2-SE tankers instead, with an initial order of 22. However, there simply were not enough of the specified generator plants available. On the other hand, General Electric indicated its ability to provide the larger  turbo-electric plants designed for the P2-SE2-R1 Admiral-class fast transports, and Marinship's naval architects modified the original Sun design to make room for the larger installation. By the end of the year the Navy, unenthusiastic about the slower Suamicos, was eager to acquire the more powerful new version and requisitioned the first nine, which were launched starting in April 1943 and after conversion as fleet oilers started commissioning in October, as AO-80, USS Escambia, through AO-88.

The Maritime Commission followed its initial order of 22 T2-SE-A2s with another for 18 more; the Navy would acquire six of these as AO-91 through 96. By the time these started entering service in late 1944 the Navy was finding that fresh water was becoming more of a problem in the Pacific than fuel; accordingly Pasig and Abatan were converted to water-distilling ships (AW-3 and 4), and Soubarissen into a water tanker.

The A3s
On 16 October 1944 the Chief of Naval Operations recommended that the Maritime Commission building program for the last half of 1945 be modified to provide for the construction of nine additional oilers for the Navy. On 2 November 1944 the MC added to its program the construction of four ships at Marinship to the 10,000-horsepower T2-SE-A3 design together with five T3s at Bethlehem Steel. The T2-SE-A3 type was essentially an A2 built to Navy standards from the start rather than being modified later (converting a civilian tanker to a Navy fleet oiler represented an additional 4–6 months' work after delivery). The last three ships were completed without these features, after the Navy canceled them in the waning days of the war.

Postwar service
All of the oilers of the class were decommissioned to reserve in 1946; however all were reactivated for tanker duties with civilian crews by the Naval Transport Service and its successor the Military Sea Transportation Service in 1947–1950, except for Saranac, which had been converted to a floating electric power plant to supply the naval base at Guam, and Ponaganset, which broke in half and sank during her pre-reactivation overhaul. The Escambias were retired to the National Defense Reserve Fleet by the end of the 1950s, while the somewhat more economical Suamicos soldiered on through the Vietnam War; Cowanesque struck a reef and foundered off Okinawa in 1972. Because of their 7.5 megawatt generating capacity, six of the Escambias were transferred to the United States Army and converted to floating power plants in 1965–66, serving in that role in Vietnam. When Saugatuck went to the breakers in 2006 she was the last survivor of the Navy's Type T2 oilers.

Ships of the class

See also
United States Navy oiler
T-2 Tanker

Notes

Auxiliary replenishment ship classes
 
Turbo-electric steamships